Shahrak-e Aliabad (also Romanized as Shahrak-e ‘Alīābād; also known as ‘Alīābād and ‘Ālīābād) is a village in Fathabad Rural District, in the Central District of Qir and Karzin County, Fars Province, Iran. At the 2006 census, its population was 2,202, in 496 families.

References 

Populated places in Qir and Karzin County